Richard Knowles, Knolles or Knollys may refer to:

Richard Knollys (died 1596) (1548–1596), MP
Richard Knolles (c. 1540–1610), English historian
Richard Brinsley Knowles (1820–1882), nineteenth-century British journalist
Dick Knowles (1917–2008), British politician
Richard T. Knowles (1916–2013), United States Army general